,  sometimes spelled as Keti Koti (Sranantongo: "the chain is cut" or "the chain is broken"), or officially  (Dutch: Day of the Freedoms) is an annual celebration on 1 July that marks Emancipation Day in Suriname. The day is also known as Manspasi Dei or Prisiri Manspasi, meaning "Emancipation" or "Emancipation Festival". or Kettingsnijden (Dutch: chain cutting).

Ketikoti marks the date when slavery was abolished in Suriname in 1863. However, enslaved people in Suriname would not be fully free until 1873, after a mandatory 10-year transition period during which time they were required to work on the plantations for minimal pay and with state sanctioned force: if they were discovered outside without a pass, they could be jailed. On June 30, 1963, the statue of Kwakoe was unveiled in Paramaribo, Suriname's capital city to commemorate the abolition of slavery. 

After 1873 many slaves left the plantations where they had worked for several generations, in favor of the city of Paramaribo. The former slave keepers were compensated. For the 32,911 released people that were kept as slaves in Suriname, an amount of ƒ 9,867,780.00 (In 2020 about €250 million) was paid to the slave keepers.

As of 2009 several cities in the Netherlands hosted various activities, making this day a day of national celebration and remembrance throughout the country. Since 2002 there is an official monument for remembrance of the slavery in the Kingdom of the Netherlands. This  ("National Monument Slavery History") is in the Oosterpark in Amsterdam. The Keti Koti festival marks the date when slavery was abolished in Suriname and the Dutch Antilles in 1863. The festival organisation also aims to pressure the Dutch government for reparations and research. As of 2020, it is still unclear when the first slaves arrived.

References

External links
 Website about Dutch Slavery (in Dutch)
 1863 Abolition of Slavery by the Rijksmuseum

History of Suriname
Emancipation day
Public holidays in Suriname